Julian Chagrin (born 22 February 1940) is a British-Israeli comedy actor. He is the husband of actress and comedian Rolanda Chagrin.

Biography
Chagrin was born in London. His father was the composer and conductor Francis Chagrin, who was born to Jewish parents in Bucharest, Romania, while his mother was Irish.

He is perhaps best known as one of the tennis-playing mimes in the 1966 cult film Blowup,  and as the 'secret lemonade drinker' in a popular advert for R. White's Lemonade in the 1970s. After appearing in films such as Danger Route (1967), The Bliss of Mrs. Blossom (1968) and Alfred the Great (1969), he played Bill the Lizard in Alice's Adventures in Wonderland (1972), which notably featured Peter Sellers as the March Hare and Spike Milligan as the Gryphon, and he acted with Sellers and Milligan again in The Great McGonagall in 1974. He also appeared as Maxi Grease, an odious TV host, in "Superstar", an episode of The Goodies, and as one half of a murderous comedy duo, together with Jimmy Jewel, in an episode of The Avengers. He also played the part of The Maestro in TV series The Orchestra which he also wrote and directed, alongside Sefi Rivlin in 1985 to 1987.

In 2002 has played Simon in English-Time.

External links

References

1940 births
Living people
British male television actors
Israeli male television actors
People educated at St Marylebone Grammar School
English people of Irish descent
English emigrants to Israel
Israeli people of Irish descent
Israeli people of Romanian-Jewish descent
Male actors from London